FDU-PB-22 is a derivative of JWH-018 that is presumed to be a potent agonist of the CB1 receptor, and has been sold online as a designer drug.

Pharmacology
FDU-PB-22 acts as a full agonist with a binding affinity of 1.19nM at CB1 and 2.43nM at CB2 cannabinoid receptors.

Legal status 

FDU-PB-22 is a controlled substance in Germany and is banned in Japan and Sweden.

See also 

 5F-PB-22
 AM-2201
 BB-22
 FUB-JWH-018
 AB-FUBINACA
 ADB-FUBINACA
 AMB-FUBINACA
 FUB-144
 FUB-APINACA
 FUB-PB-22
 MDMB-FUBICA
 MDMB-FUBINACA
 PB-22

References 

Designer drugs
Fluoroarenes
Naphthoylindoles
Indolecarboxylates